Jana Galíková (née Hlaváčová) (born 22 January 1963 in Brno) is an orienteering competitor who competed for Czechoslovakia. She received two silver medals and four bronze medals at the 1987, 1989 and 1991 World Orienteering Championships.

References

1963 births
Living people
Sportspeople from Brno
Czechoslovak orienteers
Female orienteers
Foot orienteers
World Orienteering Championships medalists